Calycodidae is a family of trematodes belonging to the order Plagiorchiida.

Genera:
 Calycodes Looss, 1901

References

Plagiorchiida